Benoît Pourtanel (born 12 April 1974) is a French ice hockey player. He competed in the men's tournament at the 2002 Winter Olympics.

References

1974 births
Living people
Olympic ice hockey players of France
Ice hockey players at the 2002 Winter Olympics
People from Ris-Orangis
Sportspeople from Essonne